Pradhan Mantri (translation: Prime Minister) is an hour long weekly TV program broadcast on Zee TV in 2001. The show was conceptualized by well known editor-journalist M.J. Akbar and directed by Ketan Mehta and Shrivallabh Vyas.

Cast 
 Kay Kay Menon as The Prime Minister of India Anirudh Prakash
 Shrivallabh Vyas as Member of parliament Mr. Gupt
 as Savita Ganpati, I&B Minister
 Anupam Shyam as Ramji Yadav, one of the MP and HRD Minister
 Achyut Potdar as The President of India

References

External links 
 Watch Pradhan Mantri (Zee) on YouTube

Zee TV original programming
Political drama television series
Indian political television series